The Men's individual table tennis - Class 3 tournament at the 2012 Summer Paralympics in London is taking place from 30 August to 2 September 2012 at ExCeL Exhibition Centre. Classes 1-5 are for athletes with a physical impairment that affects their legs, and who compete in a sitting position. The lower the number, the greater the impact the impairment has on an athlete’s ability to compete.

In the preliminary stage, athletes compete in eight groups of three. Winners of each group qualify for the quarter finals.

Results
All times are local (BST/UTC+1)

Finals

Preliminary round

Group A

30 August, 09:00

30 August, 19:20

31 August, 18:00

Group B

30 August, 09:00

30 August, 19:20

31 August, 18:00

Group C

30 August, 09:00

30 August, 19:20

31 August, 18:00

Group D

30 August, 09:00

30 August, 19:20

31 August, 18:00

Group E

30 August, 09:40

30 August, 20:00

31 August, 18:40

Group F

30 August, 09:40

30 August, 20:00

31 August, 18:40

Group G

30 August, 09:40

30 August, 20:00

31 August, 18:40

Group H

30 August, 09:40

30 August, 20:00

31 August, 18:40

References

MI03